Stansfield is an English surname deriving from the Old English 'stan' (meaning stony) and 'feld' (field). This toponymic surname originates from two possible locations in England: the ancient township of Stansfield (near Todmorden, West Yorkshire), which was listed in the Domesday Book of 1086 as 'Stanesfelt’; and the village of Stansfield, Suffolk. The surname is most commonly found among families originating in the English counties of Yorkshire and Lancashire, especially around the town of Todmorden, West Yorkshire. Other variants include Stansfeld, Stanfield, and Standfield.

Notable people with this surname include:

Stansfield (surname)
 Adam Stansfield (1978–2010), English professional footballer
 Alfred Stansfield (1871–1944), British-Canadian metallurgist (brother of Herbert Stansfield)
 Anita Stansfield (b.1961), American novelist
 Charles Stansfield or Charles Henry Renn Stansfield (1856–1926), British Admiralty civil servant
 Claire Stansfield (b.1964), English-Canadian actress, director, fashion-designer and model
 Colin Stansfield (fl.1938–45), English rugby player
 Colin Stansfield Smith (1932–2013), British architect, academic and cricketer
 Elsa Stansfield (1945–2004), Scottish artist
 Emma Stansfield (b.1978), Welsh actress
 Fred Stansfield or Frederick Stansfield (1917–2014), Welsh footballer
 Gareth Stansfield (b.1973), British academic and Professor of Middle East Studies at University of Exeter
 Grace Stansfield (1898–1979), English actress, singer and comedienne (known as "Gracie Fields")
 George Norman Stansfield (1926–2018), British diplomat and High Commissioner to Solomon Islands
 Herbert Stansfield (1872–1960), British physicist (brother of Alfred Stansfield)
 James Stansfield (disambiguation), multiple people, including:
 James Stansfield (footballer) (b.1978), English professional footballer
 Bert Stansfield or James Burton Stansfield (1874–1938), English football manager
 James Warden Stansfield (1906–1991), English barrister and judge
 Jack Stansfield (b.1896), English professional footballer
 Jay Stansfield (b.2002), English professional footballer
 Jem Stansfield (fl.2001–), British engineer, inventor and TV presenter
 John Stansfield (disambiguation), multiple people, including:
 Lisa Stansfield (b.1966), English singer, songwriter and actress
 Randell Stansfield (b.1950), American military officer 
 Thomas Edward Knowles Stansfield (1862–1939), English pathologist and medical officer
 Walter Stansfield (1917–1984), British police officer, soldier and Chief Constable of Denbighshire and Derbyshire
 William Stansfield (disambiguation), multiple people, including:
 William Stansfield (Railway officer) (1874–1946), English/Australian railway officer and soldier
 William Crompton-Stansfield (1790–1871), English Whig politician and MP for Huddersfield

Stansfield (Given name)
 Arthur Stansfield Dixon (1856–1929), English metal worker and architect
 Arthur Stansfield Peebles (1872–1933), English army officer
 Horace Stansfield Collier (1864–1930), English surgeon (brother of James Stansfield Collier)
 James Stansfield Collier (1870–1935), English physician and neurologist (brother of Horace Stansfield Collier)
 Norman Cornish or Norman Stansfield Cornish (1919–2014), English mining artist
 Bob Frankford or Robert Timothy Stansfield Frankford (1939–2015), Canadian politician
 Stansfield Turner (1923–2018), American admiral and Director of Central Intelligence

Fictional characters
 Aaron Stansfield, character from the prime time soap opera Dynasty (2017)
 Douglas Stansfield, character from the Twilight Zone episode The Long Morrow (1964)
 Norman Stansfield, character from the film Léon: The Professional (1994)
 Robert Stansfield, character from the film The Family (2013)

See also
 Stansfield, West Yorkshire
 Stansfield (disambiguation)
 Stansfeld (surname)
 Stanfield (surname)
 Standfield

References 

Toponymic surnames
Surnames of Old English origin